Anabela Basalo (born September 4, 1972) is a Serbian writer.

Biography
She graduated from the Third Gymnasium in Belgrade, and began studies of biology, which she never finished.

Before she wrote his first book she worked as a seller, waitress, held her own coffeehouse, and worked in the time-share business. Basalo responded to an ad where the girls were asked to work on phone sex lines – to read erotic stories – reportedly with desire to write them. After seven years writing the story was mature enough for the novel.

Works
Basalo attracted attention with her first novel, Žena s greškom (Woman with Error). Not long after it she published another novel, Peta ljubav (Fifth Love). Since then, she published novels Erotske price (Erotic Stories), Tajne ženskih jastuka (Secrets of Women Pillows), etc.

Her books speak about the world of male domination, the world of money, power and urban Belgrade. Although it appears that her novels talk about sex, the story is in fact about the eternal themes: searching for identity, loneliness, environment, what happens when someone decides to be different. She openly and honestly talk about male-female relations. Basalo does so even when writing for women magazines.

Critics said of her that she is an "author of a special sensibility, devoted to the personal understanding of the position of women in the world of men."

Trivia
In April 2004, she posed for the Serbian version of Playboy.

In April 2008, she participated in a campaign of gay organization Queeria named "Love on the streets! Hooligans in prisons!".

External links
Interview with Anabela Basalo 
About the book "Woman with Error"

References

1972 births
Living people
Writers from Zenica
Serbs of Bosnia and Herzegovina
Serbian novelists
Serbian women short story writers
Serbian short story writers
Serbian women novelists
20th-century Serbian writers
21st-century Serbian writers
20th-century Serbian women
21st-century Serbian women
20th-century Serbian women writers
21st-century Serbian women writers